Sergei Olegovich Gavrilov (born 14 January 1987) is a Russian professional football player. He plays for FC Lokomotiv Liski.

Club career
He made his debut for FC Tom Tomsk on 13 July 2005 in the Russian Cup game against FC Spartak Kostroma.

He played in the Russian Football National League for FC Fakel Voronezh in the 2011–12 season.

External links
 
 

1987 births
Sportspeople from Tomsk
Living people
Russian footballers
Association football midfielders
FC Tom Tomsk players
FC Fakel Voronezh players
FC Dynamo Bryansk players
FC Taganrog players